Dorothy Hetty Fosbery Jenner  (1 March 1891 – 24 March 1985), also known as Dorothy Gordon, was an Australian actress, journalist, and radio broadcaster. She worked as an actress in Hollywood, played the lead in the Australian film Hills of Hate (1926) and did art direction on For the Term of His Natural Life (1927). She is best known for her long career as a columnist and radio commentator under the name Andrea. She was a prisoner of war in Hong Kong during World War II.

Andrea Place, in the Canberra suburb of Bonython, is named in her honour.

Partial filmography
 The Chorus Girl's Romance (1920)
 First Love (1921)
 Hills of Hate (1926)
 For the Term of His Natural Life (1927)

References

External links
 
 Dorothy Gordon at Women Film Pioneers Project
 

1891 births
1985 deaths
Australian film actresses
Australian art directors
World War II prisoners of war held by Japan
Australian prisoners of war
Australian Officers of the Order of the British Empire
Women film pioneers
20th-century Australian journalists
20th-century Australian women